Die Freiheitlichen, abbreviated dF, is a regionalist, separatist and national-conservative political party in South Tyrol, Italy. The party, which is part of the South Tyrolean independence movement, seeks to represent the German-speaking majority and Ladin-speaking minority in the province and to separate it from Italy. Broadly speaking, its ideology is similar to that of the Freedom Party of Austria (FPÖ) and the two parties maintain close contacts. The long-time leader and honorary president of the party is Pius Leitner. In the 2013 provincial election the party came a distant second to the dominant South Tyrolean People's Party (SVP).

The party's name is variously translated into English as "The Freedomites", a term frequently used for FPÖ's members by English media, and by the FPÖ itself, "The Libertarians", and "The Liberals".

History

Foundation and early years
In 1992, a group of young right-wingers led by the so-called "gang of four", including Christian Waldner, former leader of the Junge Generation (the youth section of the South Tyrolean People's Party, SVP), Peter Paul Reiner, Pius Leitner and Stephan Gutweniger, left SVP. They were soon joined by disgruntled former members of the Freedom Party of South Tyrol (FPS), who were marginalized after the merger in the Union for South Tyrol (UfS).

They launched the new party on 7 December 1992. In doing this, they were strongly encouraged by Jörg Haider, at the time leader of the Freedom Party of Austria, which is colloquially known as Die Freiheitlichen. Gerold Meraner, former leader of FPS who had been a founding member of UfS, considered the new party as the legitimate heir of his FPS.

Under the leadership of Waldner, the party won 6.1% of the vote in the 1993 provincial election and got two provincial councillors elected, Waldner and Leitner. Soon after the election, there were clashes over the party political line between Waldner, who espoused more nationalist attitudes, and Leitner, who was the leader of the internal liberal faction. This finally led Waldner to resign in 1994 and to start his own short-lived party, "The Liberals" (renamed "Alliance 98" in 1996).

Decline and resurgence
In February 1997 Waldner was shot dead by his former political ally Reiner. This dramatic event was a shock for the party and led it into a decline which seemed irreversible. In the 1998 provincial election the party's share of vote was only 2.5% and Leitner alone was elected in the Provincial Council.

After that, the party saw a resurgence in 2003, when it jumped to 5.0% in the provincial election and managed to elect two provincial councillors again: Leitner and Ulli Mair, a young woman who had been party secretary since 2001.

In the 2006 general election dF obtained 5.4%. In the 2008 general election they almost doubled their share of vote to 9.4%.

In the subsequent provincial election, dF became the second-largest party in the Province with the 14.3% of the vote (a net gain of 9.3%) and had five provincial councillors elected (up from the previous two). For the first time in history the two largest political forces of South Tyrol were German-speaking parties.

More electoral successes
In February 2012, after 18 years at the head of the party, Leitner chose to step down and promote Mair as his successor.

In March 2012, in the midst of the European sovereign-debt crisis and recession in Italy, the party officially turned to separatism, proposing the creation of a South Tyrolean independent and sovereign Freistaat (free state) through a referendum, which would need the approval also of the Italian-speaking minority.

In the 2013 general election the party won 15.9% of the vote, its best result ever.

In the 2013 provincial election dF won 17.9% (another record high and +3.6% since 2008), resulting in six provincial councillors.

In the 2014 European Parliament election the party ran in alliance with the Lega Nord (LN).

Scandal and new leadership
In June 2014, following a scandal on advance retirement payments which invested all the regional councillors, the party entirely renewed its leadership by electing Walter Blaas president and appointing Simon Auer secretary. The alliance with the LN was cemented by the endorsement of South Tyrolean self-determination by LN leader Matteo Salvini, and the candidacy of Rosa Lamprecht, Blaas' wife, in the LNST slate in the 2016 Bolzano municipal election.

In March 2017 Leitner resigned from the Provincial Council after being convicted in a minor expenses scandal.

In May 2017 Andreas Leiter Reber, a hardliner, was elected party president, by beating the more moderate Arno Mall, and re-launched the concept of Freistaat.

The dF did not participate in the 2018 general election, while it lost most of its support, stopping at 6.2%, in the 2018 provincial election

In the 2020 municipal elections the party stood as a candidate in eleven South Tyrolean municipalities, in Merano, Bressanone, Lana, Caldaro, Eppan, Parcines, Mühlbach, Gais, Moelten, Marlengo and Burgstall, as well as with Freedom Party representatives on citizens' lists in Nals, Lajen, Rodeneck, St. Lorenzen and Sand in Taufers. After the election, the Freedom Party will have 18 municipal councillors nationwide. In 2015, there were 54 councillors, which reflects a significant decrease.

Popular support
The electoral results of the party in the Province of Bolzano since 1993 are shown in the tables below.

Election results

Provincial Council

Leadership
President: Christian Waldner (1992–1994), Pius Leitner (1994–2012), Ulli Mair (2012–2014), Walter Blaas (2014–2017), Andreas Leiter Reber (2017–present)
Honorary President: Pius Leitner (2013–present)
Secretary: Pius Leitner (1992–1994), Sigmar Stocker (1995–2001), Ulli Mair (2001–2012), Michael Demanega (2012–2014), Simon Auer (2014–2017), Florian von Ach (2017–2019), Otto Mahlknecht (2019–present)

References

Political parties in South Tyrol
German diaspora in Europe
German nationalist political parties
South Tyrolean nationalism
National liberal parties
National conservative parties